Thompson Square was a rapid transit station in Charlestown, Massachusetts. It served the Charlestown Elevated, part of the MBTA's Orange Line, from 1902 until 1975.

History
Thompson Square station opened on May 22, 1902, almost a year after the rest of the Charlestown Elevated line, as an infill station. It was closed in 1975, when the line was rerouted into a tunnel that was constructed as part of the Haymarket North Extension project. The station was lowered to the ground, with plans to reuse the structure as a restaurant, but it was destroyed by fire on April 19, 1976, before the conversion could be done.

References

External links

Charlestown, Boston
Railway stations in Boston
Orange Line (MBTA) stations
Former MBTA stations in Massachusetts